Mr. Sad Clown is a music album by the BoDeans, released on April 6, 2010. It peaked at number 172 on the Billboard 200 chart and number 26 on the Top Independent Albums chart.

Track listing 
 "Stay"
 "Shine"
 "If..."
 "Say Goodbye"
 "Don't Fall Down"
 "Cheesecake Pan"
 "Easy Love"
 "Today"
 "Headed for the End of the World"
 "Let It Ride"
 "All the Blues"
 "Feel Lil' Love"
 "Almost Ready"
 "Back Then"
 "Gone X3"

Personnel
BoDeans
 Kurt Neumann – vocals, acoustic guitar, electric guitar, keyboards, bass, drums, percussion
 Sam Llanas – vocals, acoustic guitar
Additional personnel
 Joseph Serrato - saxophone
 Michael Ramos - trumpet, Hammond B3

References 

2010 albums
BoDeans albums